Maria Pekli (born 12 June 1972 in Baja, Hungary) is an Australian judoka of Hungarian descent. She was Australian Champion in the u/57 kg division for seven consecutive years, between 1997 and 2003.

She won a bronze medal in the lightweight (57 kg) division at the 2000 Summer Olympics, the first Australian woman to win an official Olympic Judo medal (although Sue Williams won a medal at the 1988 Summer Olympics when Women's Judo was a demonstration sport).

Along with Cuba's Driulys González and Japan's Ryoko Tamura-Tani, Pekli became in 2008 the first female judoka to compete at five Olympics. The only other judokas to compete at five Olympics are Belgian Robert Van de Walle and Puerto Rican judoka-bobsledder Jorge Bonnet.

In 2011, Pekli was awarded Life Membership of Judo Australia for her contribution to the sport at the Australian National Judo Championships.

Achievements

References

External links
 
 
 
 
 
 Videos of Maria Pekli (judovision.org)

1972 births
Living people
20th-century Hungarian people
21st-century Hungarian people
Olympic medalists in judo
Hungarian female judoka
Olympic judoka of Hungary
Judoka at the 1992 Summer Olympics
Judoka at the 1996 Summer Olympics
Australian female judoka
Olympic judoka of Australia
Olympic bronze medalists for Australia
Judoka at the 2000 Summer Olympics
Judoka at the 2004 Summer Olympics
Judoka at the 2008 Summer Olympics
Commonwealth Games gold medallists for Australia
Hungarian emigrants to Australia
People from Baja, Hungary
Medalists at the 2000 Summer Olympics
Commonwealth Games medallists in judo
Judoka at the 2002 Commonwealth Games
Sportspeople from Bács-Kiskun County
Medallists at the 2002 Commonwealth Games